The Hocking Valley Scenic Railway is a non-profit, 501c3, volunteer-operated tourist railroad attraction that operates out of Nelsonville, Athens County, Ohio. It is also located near the popular Hocking Hills State Park in nearby Hocking County. It uses former trackage of the Chesapeake & Ohio Railway, which was in turn originally Hocking Valley Railway trackage. The current operation was founded in 1972.

General Information
Most of the trackage used by the railway is known as the Hocking Valley Railway Historic District, and has been placed on the National Register of Historic Places for Athens County, Ohio. The trackage was once owned by the Hocking Valley Railway, which eventually became part of the Chesapeake & Ohio Railway. The HVSR began operating trains with steam locomotive 2-8-0 No. 33 built for the Lake Superior & Ishpeming in 1916, and operated over the former Monday Creek Branch to Carbon Hill. Today, the tourist trains operate along the former C&O Armitage Subdivision between Nelsonville and a point just east of Logan, Ohio.

History

1864 to 1930
The current route's origins can be traced to April 1864, when the Mineral Railroad was chartered to build a railroad line between Columbus and Athens, a distance of about 72 miles. Little was done until 1867, when the Mineral Railroad was renamed the Columbus & Hocking Valley Railroad. The line was completed in sections between 1868 and 1870, when the first passenger train operated between the two cities on July 25, 1870. The main commodity hauled by the C&HV was coal, with clay products and related materials right behind. The C&HV eventually became part of the new Columbus, Hocking Valley and Toledo Railroad with the merger of the Columbus and Toledo Railroad and Ohio and West Virginia Railway in 1881. This new system spanned from the Lake Erie port of Toledo through Columbus to Athens and a branch to the Ohio River cities of Gallipolis and Pomeroy. In time, the CHV&T was reorganized as the Hocking Valley Railway in 1899, and existed as such until May 1930, when the Chesapeake & Ohio Railway merged the railroad into its system to create the Hocking Division.

C&O Years
Passenger service was eventually discontinued on December 31, 1949. By this point, the coal business was fading south of Columbus, and the C&O was busy operating many trains on the Columbus-Toledo portion (which connected to the C&O's mainline through [West Virginia] with the Lake Erie). Over time, business was down to a single branch line local train, the "Nelsonville Turn", which finally was discontinued itself around 1980.

Starting Out: Laying the Foundation
By this time, the Hocking Valley Scenic Railway had been operating over seven miles of the old Monday Creek Branch to Carbon Hill from Nelsonville since 1972. The HVSR had been created by three men: Frank L. McCauley, Ted Goodman, and Jerry Ballard. It was initially to be the "Salt Creek" railroad, as they had intentions of purchasing the abandoned Detroit, Toledo and Ironton Railroad line that operated into Wellston, Ohio. During this time, they had managed to purchase three former Erie Railroad commuter coaches, piecing together two of them to be able to transport passengers. However, before details of the railroad line itself could be finalized, a scrapper had salvaged the line. But just in time, they were notified of the Monday Creek line and its impending scrapping. This they were able to purchase before it was too late, purchasing it from the scrapper himself. Before all of this, however, they had already purchased a steam locomotive in 1965, former Lake Superior and Ishpeming 2-8-0 No. 33 and were working on its restoration at the C&O's Yard A in Columbus.

Monday Creek and the 1970s
The first "station" of the Hocking Valley Scenic was a tarp stretched across four poles. Later on, a small building was donated.  Eventually, the final structure used as a depot on the same site (near the intersection of State Route 691 and U.S. 33) was an original Hocking Valley Railway train order office originally located in Lancaster, Ohio at the crossing of the Pennsylvania Railroad and the HV. During the early 1970s, once the season was completed for the year, the 33 would be moved to the C&O's Parson Yard roundhouse during the winter for storage and maintenance. It wouldn't be until 1976 that the locomotive would be kept in the HVSR's own (first) engine house in Nelsonville. This engine house was constructed by Bonanza Polebarn Company. Tracks were laid to the structure by the HVSR's own volunteers, with the assistance of a C&O surveyor. The work was done between 1975 and 1976, and was the first indoor shop facility owned by the railroad and was the first new track installed by HVSR crews. The track to the shop was donated and came from a spur in Logan. The early years were rough financially, and in order to make a bank payment, the "Lost Run spur" was scrapped to keep up. It was also during the late 1970s that the HVSR's Santa Claus trains began operating, which are still every year to this day.

Transition Years: The 1980s
Starting around 1980, the Hocking Valley Scenic began moving operations toward Athens. This was a time of transition between the Monday Creek and the former C&O Armitage Subdivision remnant south of Nelsonville. Trains were operated from the old Monday Creek station site, backed to the main line, and then operated round trip south to Glen Ebon. However, the HVSR trains never made it to Athens before focus shifted north. Trains began using the present station site at 33 West Canal Street, which is near the original passenger station and freight house sites (both already razed), in 1981. At the end of 1981, the railroad's first diesel arrived, former U.S. Army 45-ton switcher No. 7318. The present depot, based on a Hocking Valley prototype once located in Rising Sun, Ohio, was constructed in 1982. Ted Goodman, an architect by trade, designed the structure, while funding and land was provided by the Baird Trust Foundation. The trees used for the lumber were donated by local attorney Mike Nolan, and the lumber was milled by Hocking Technical College (lumber mill now gone, the site now occupied by the Hocking College Public Safety Services building). The station's building contractor was Denver Stump. It was also in 1982 that two more steam locomotives arrived, donated by American Electric Power, which were 0-6-0 No. 3 and "fireless" 0-4-0 No. 2 (it wouldn't be until 2003 that No. 3 was moved into the shop to begin restoration efforts). The Monday Creek Branch was finally scrapped in 1983.

Looking North to Logan
As the C&O and its parent company CSX began moving out of the market south of Columbus, it was becoming apparent that in order to maintain a connection to the outside world by rail, the railroad would have to look north. With that, the rest of the Armitage Subdivision was acquired piecemeal between just east of Logan and Nelsonville. The HVSR began operating trains to East Clayton and eventually Diamond (both once homes to large brick plants) by 1985. By the late 1980s and early 1990s, the trains were running over the present route between East Logan and Nelsonville, with a shorter trip to the last remaining Ohio company town known as Haydenville. It was during the late 1980s that the Hocking acquired GP7 No. 5833 from the C&O, and in the early 1990s, it was restored to its original as-delivered paint scheme. Charter trips to Canal Winchester, Ohio were also going on during the early and mid-1990s, operating over the remainder of former C&O track now owned by the Indiana & Ohio Railway. But in 1995, the HVSR lost its original engine house as the land it occupied was leased and had been sold out from under them. As a result, and with new federal boiler regulations and inspections, with no facility, No. 33 was sidelined at the conclusion of the 1996 season until it was traded to Ohio Central owner Jerry Jacobson, who eventually restored it to operation again. No. 33 was traded for GP10 No. 701 in 2003, and 701 works off and on with 5833, giving the old C&O workhorse a break from time to time.

Present
The railroad owns and uses historic rolling stock, and offers scenic rides up the Hocking River valley.  It sometimes hosts specialty excursions, such as wine-tasting trips, Easter Bunny, robbery trains, and the "Santa Trains." It was named one of the world's best family train trips  by the Travel Channel in 2013.

Today's locomotive equipment consists of Electro-Motive Division-built GP7 No. 5833, formerly of the C&O, and GP10 Paducah-built No. 701, formerly of the Illinois Central Gulf as it's No. 8307. Other locomotives include Baldwin-Lima-Hamilton RS-4-TC No. 4005 and General Electric 45-tonner No. 7318. There is currently one coal-burning steam locomotive undergoing a full restoration in their Nelsonville shop, former Ohio Power Company 0-6-0 Baldwin-built No. 3.
In 2019, restoration efforts on No. 3 were completed in March, and the locomotive moved under its own power in early April for the first time in decades. No. 3 is currently working for the Summer season, including pulling the line’s “The Friendliest Train Robbery” service on June 8,2019.
Passenger equipment includes commuter coaches from the Chicago & Northwestern and Chicago, Rock Island & Pacific, a day-coach from the Baltimore & Ohio, a combination baggage-passenger car also of the B&O (the oldest piece of equipment, built in 1917), and two converted flat cars used as open-air passenger cars equipped with wooden bench seats. All of the enclosed coaches are equipped with heating units (electric or coal). A former Penn Central transfer caboose is used as the on-board generator car, supplying electricity for the trains.

Locomotives

Gallery

See also

 Hockhocking Adena Bikeway
 Hocking Canal
 Hocking River
 Wayne National Forest
 Zaleski State Forest
 Hocking State Forest
 Hocking Hills
 Hocking Hills State Park
 Rocky Brands
 Hocking College
 Stuart's Opera House
 Estel Crabtree
 US Route 33
 List of Ohio railroads
 List of heritage railroads in the United States
 List of Ohio train stations
 Rail transportation in the United States
 National Register of Historic Places listings in Athens County, Ohio
 National Register of Historic Places listings in Hocking County, Ohio
 EMD GP7
 EMD GP10

References

External links

http://www.hvsry.org - Official website
http://www.facebook.com/hvsry - Hocking Valley Scenic Railway Facebook Page
http://www.pinterest.com/hvsr - HVSR Pinterest
http://www.davedupler.com/hvsry/ - Dave Dupler's Personal Photos of the HVSR *** No longer active ***
HawkinsRails Hocking Valley Scenic page

Tourist attractions in Athens County, Ohio
Transportation in Hocking County, Ohio
Heritage railroads in Ohio
Transportation in Athens County, Ohio
Tourist attractions in Hocking County, Ohio
National Register of Historic Places in Athens County, Ohio
National Register of Historic Places in Hocking County, Ohio
Spin-offs of the Chesapeake and Ohio Railway
Historic districts on the National Register of Historic Places in Ohio